"Feel Good" is a song by American DJs Gryffin and Illenium. The song features the vocals of American singer Daya, and was released on March 3, 2017, through Darkroom Records and Interscope Records.

Background and composition
The song was released to iTunes on March 3, 2017, though Interscope Records and Darkroom Records. The song was written by Toby Gad, Grace Tandon and Nisha Asnani and produced by Daniel Gryffin and Illenium.

Gryffin explained that he met up with Illenium while on tour in 2016 and together created a sound which ended up not being used for the final song, but featured on "Free Fall" by Illenium. However, Gryffin worked on the track for a few weeks following the tour and invited Daya in to redo her vocals (despite her having a 100 degree fever), leading to the song in its current form.

Music video
The music video for the song was released on April 28, 2017, on Gryffin's Vevo channel on YouTube.

Track listing

Charts

Weekly charts

Year-end charts

Certifications

Release history

References

2017 singles
2017 songs
Interscope Records singles
Songs written by Toby Gad
Illenium songs
Future bass songs
Daya (singer) songs
Gryffin songs
Songs written by Illenium
Songs written by Gryffin
Songs written by Daya (singer)